The 2007 season was SK Brann's 99th season and their 21st consecutive season in the Norwegian Premier League. Brann won the Norwegian Premier League in 2007. In the end, they finished 6 points ahead of their nearest rival, Stabæk. The team did cause a small sensation, and bitter disappointment among tens of thousands of Brann-supporters who had gathered in Bergen to watch the game live, on 20 October, by losing to Ålesund 1–2 in the 24th of 26 rounds, a match where a draw would have set aside all doubt about Brann's league win. However two days later, Viking defeated Brann's last rival to the gold medals Stabæk with a 2-1 result, thereby securing Brann the first league championship since 1963 anyway.

Brann also qualified for the group stage of the UEFA Cup for the first time after beating Club Brugge from Belgium in the qualifier. The team won its first victory in the group stage of the UEFA Cup by defeating the Croatian side Dinamo Zagreb. On 21 December, the draw for the Round of 32 of The UEFA Cup was made and Brann will face a tough test against Premiership side Everton who won all four of the games in Group A. The first leg was lost at home 0 -2, 13 February. The return leg is at Goodison Park a week later. They lost the return leg 6-1

The Norwegian football cup ended for Brann in the 4th round, as in the 2006 season, where they was defeated by Viking.

Information

Manager: Mons Ivar Mjelde
League: Norwegian Premier League
Shirt supplier: Kappa 
Shirt sponsor: Sparebanken Vest
Average league attendance: 17,225 
League: Champions 
Norwegian Cup: 4th round (0-2 vs. Viking) 
UEFA Cup: Qualified for Round of 32
Top goal scorer: Thorstein Helstad (22 in league, 27 in total)
Player of the year: Thorstein Helstad

Squad 

As of July 2007. Matches and goals updated as of 28 October and is for league only. 

 
 

 (until July 2007)
 

 (until July 2007)
 (C)

 (until July 2007)

 

 

 (until June 2007)

Out on loan 

 (loan to Løv-Ham)
 (loan to Løv-Ham)

Transfers

Results

Highlights 

5 January: Brann signed the American fullback Ramiro Corrales from Ham-Kam. The deal was worth about NOK 2.000.000.
1 February: Charlie Miller's contract was terminated. Miller had stated that he couldn't play under the leadership of Mons Ivar Mjelde. He later signed with the Belgium side Lierse S.K.
9 February: Ramiro Corrales was deported from Norway after playing the whole 2006 season without a work permit. Brann appealed the decision, still hoping to keep Corrales in the squad.
12 February: Brann signed the young goalie Kenneth Udjus from F.K. Arendal.
25 February: Brann lost the seasons first official game 3–2 against OB in the Royal League. Both teams were already qualified for the quarter-finals.
26 February: Brann drew Brøndby IF in the Royal League quarter-finals. The match will take place at Brøndby Stadion on 1 March.
1 March: Brann was knocked out of the Royal League after a 0–3 defeat against Brøndby.
14 March: Ramiro Corrales was granted permanent residency in Norway, and will return to Bergen as soon as possible.
16 March: Rosenborg's Jan Gunnar Solli signed a 4-year deal with SK Brann
21 March: Steffen Haraldsen left Brann on a free transfer to Fyllingen. The young goalie never played for Brann's first team.
28 March: Migen Memelli sold to the Swedish team GAIS.
30 March: Arnaud Monkam and Kenneth Udjus were loaned out to Løv-Ham.
10 April: Brann opened the Premiership-season with a 1–0 victory against Stabæk away.
22 April: Brann crushed fellow Premiership contender Vålerenga 4–1 in their second homematch of the season. Bengt Sæternes made a huge impact by scoring a "golden hat-trick" in the first half, and securing the win with a header after 66 minutes. After three rounds, Brann is the only team in the Norwegian Premier League with all wins so far.
12 May: Brann took a lucky win against Sandefjord away, in their Premiership-match number 1000.
20 May: Brann advanced to the 2nd round of the Norwegian cup after an easy 5–0 win against Trio.
8 June: Trond Fredrik Ludvigsen was loaned out to Strømsgodset I.F. for the remainder of the 2007-season after the summer transferwindow opened on 1 July.
16 June: Brann was humiliated in Oslo after an 0–6 defeat against Lyn, in a match which saw Brann goalkeeper Håkon Opdal sent off after 43 minutes.
27 June: Brann advanced to the 4th round of the Norwegian cup after defeating Kopervik in a match where Robbie Winters scored a hat-trick. After this game Brann had won every match in the Norwegian men's football cup 2007 0–5.
1 July: Brann beat Tromsø IL 2–1 in their last game before the summer break. Brann ended up with 26 points, an 8-2-3 win-draw-loss ratio, 25 goals scored and 23 goals against. They were second only to Stabæk I.F. who had 28 points after half played season.
2 July: Brann brought Knut Walde back from Løv-Ham, 1.5 years after they sold him to the same club.
4 July: Brann signed the Swedish talent Joakim Sjöhage from IF Elfsborg. Helge Haugen left Brann after five and a half seasons to try to gain a regular spot on the team of Tromsø IL.
10 July: Erik Huseklepp came to an oral agreement with Stabæk I.F. Huseklepp's contract expires in October, and it's not yet known if he'll stay with Brann til then, or if he leaves the club this summer. Bengt Sæternes however, signed with Danish side OB, and have played his last match for Brann.
19 July: Brann crushed little Carmarthen Town F.C. 0–8 in the first leg of the First Qualifying Round of the 2007/08 UEFA cup.
22 July: Brann, number two in the Premiership beat the league-leader, Stabæk IF 3–0 at home. Brann took over the lead in the Premiership.
25 July: One man leaves, one man returns. Ardian Gashi signed with Fredrikstad after only one year in Brann. Hassan El Fakiri returns to Bergen, seven years after he left for AS Monaco.
25 July: Brann was knocked out of the Norwegian Cup after a 0–2 loss against Viking F.K.
2 August: Brann advanced to the Second Qualifying Round of the 2007/08 UEFA Cup after a 6-3 winn against Carmarthen Town F.C. in the second leg of the First Qualifying Round.
3 August: Brann are drawn against Lithuanian side FK Sūduva in the Second Qualifying Round of the 2007/08 UEFA Cup.
11 August: Brann beat Rosenborg 3–2 at home, and created a 10-point gap down to the defending Premiership-champions.
24 August: Azar Karadas signed a 3-year contract with Brann, 5 years after he left the club. The deal between Brann and Benfica is thought to be NOK 3 million.
30 August: Brann advanced to the First Round of the 2007/08 UEFA Cup after beating Sūduva 6–4 over two matches.
30 September: Brann took a large step towards the championship after crushing Lillestrøm S.K. 5–1 away, while their closest rivals, Stabæk I.F. stumbled against F.C. Lyn Oslo on Ullevaal Stadion, where they lost 2–3. With 4 matches remaining, Brann had a 7-point gap down to Viking F.K. on second place, a club they would meet in the second to last match.
4 October: Brann reached the Group stage of the 2007/08 UEFA Cup on away goals after beating Club Brugge 2–1 away in the return leg.

8 October: Brann had one hand and four fingers on the trophy after defeating F.C. Lyn Oslo 3–1 at home, thus creating a nine-point gap down to Stabæk I.F. with three rounds remaining. Brann only needed one point, or a Stabæk-loss/draw in one of the last three matches to win the league.
22 October: It became official. After Stabæk lost 1–2 against Viking F.K. away, Brann became the champions for the first time in 44 years. Brann had a nine-point gap down to Stabæk, with two rounds remaining, and could thus call themselves champions for the third time in history after their wins in 1962 and 1963.
25 October: Brann lost their first game in the Group stage of the 2007/08 UEFA Cup after a 0–1 defeat at home against Hamburger SV.
28 October: Brann defeated Viking 5–2 on Brann Stadion, and was awarded the trophy as the 2007 Norwegian Premier League Champions.
5 November: Martin Andresen notified the fans that he would leave Brann after the season. He signed a 3-year deal with Vålerenga on 6 November.

Matches (goals) 
''The table shows matches and goals in the Norwegian Premier League, Norwegian Cup, Royal League and European Cup/UEFA Cup, and was last updated after the game against FC Basel on 5 December 2007.

References 

2007
Brann
Norwegian football championship-winning seasons